Iolanda Nanni (29 November 1968 – 27 August 2018) was an Italian politician for Five Star Movement. Nanni graduated from the classical high school, before becoming a politician she worked as an employee in a private company.

In the regional elections in Lombardy in 2013 she was elected Regional Councilor, among the ranks of the 5 Star Movement in the Province of Pavia.

In January 2018 she decided to run for the 2018 parliamentary elections in the Chamber of Deputies despite being ill. She was elected to the Chamber in its constituency with 21.88% of the votes.

She had been diagnosed with cancer and died on 27 August 2018 at the age of 49. Valentina Barzotti took her place in the Chamber.

References

1968 births
2018 deaths
21st-century Italian women politicians
Five Star Movement politicians
Politicians from Pavia
Deputies of Legislature XVIII of Italy
Deaths from cancer in Lombardy
20th-century Italian women
Women members of the Chamber of Deputies (Italy)